Headquarters is an unincorporated community located within the Amwell Valley of Delaware Township in Hunterdon County, New Jersey. The settlement is centered around the intersection of Zentek Road and County Route 604 (Rosemont-Ringoes Road). The Headquarters Historic District was listed on the state and national registers of historic places in 2011 and had its boundary increased in 2016.

History

Headquarters was the site of a grist mill built by John Opdycke (1710–1777) in 1735 along the Caponockons Creek, a tributary of the Neshanic River. The mill was one of the first in Hunterdon County. The current mill was built in 1754 at the same site. It was later rebuilt in 1877 by John A. Carrell. The industry thrived until the early 20th century when the mill shut down.

The community is named Headquarters after the local tradition that George Washington used the stone house built here in 1758 as such for a few days during the American Revolutionary War.

The district was first established as a historic area by Delaware Township in the 1980s to push back against a widening of CR 604.

Historic district

The Headquarters Historic District is a  historic district encompassing the community. It was added to the National Register of Historic Places on July 14, 2011, for its significance in architecture, industry, and settlement from 1735 to 1929. The district includes seven contributing buildings, three contributing structures, and one contributing sites. The boundary was increased on February 8, 2016.

Headquarters House at 6 Zentek Road was built in 1758, probably by Opdycke, and features vernacular Georgian architecture with Victorian embellishments. The house at 402 Rosemont-Ringoes Road was built  and shows modern Colonial Revival embellishment.

See also
 National Register of Historic Places listings in Hunterdon County, New Jersey

References

External links
 

Delaware Township, Hunterdon County, New Jersey
Unincorporated communities in Hunterdon County, New Jersey
Unincorporated communities in New Jersey